La Capilla Airport,  is an airstrip  west-northwest of Entre Lagos, a town in the Los Lagos Region of Chile.

There are trees at both ends of the runway.

See also

Transport in Chile
List of airports in Chile

References

External links
OpenStreetMap - La Capilla
OurAirports - La Capilla
FallingRain - La Capilla Airport

Airports in Chile
Airports in Los Lagos Region